Stanley W. Lyson (born March 5, 1936) was a Republican member of the North Dakota Senate for the 1st district from 1999 to 2014.

Biography
Stanley Lyson graduated from Minot State University. He served in the United States Army. He is a retired sheriff. He has served in the North Dakota Senate since 1999.

He is President of the North Dakota Peace Officers Association and the North Dakota Association of Counties. He is a member of the American Legion and the Veterans of Foreign Wars. He is also a member of the Benevolent and Protective Order of Elks.

He is married to Shirley Lyson, and they have three children. They live in Williston, North Dakota and attend Gloria Dei Lutheran Church.

References

People from Williston, North Dakota
Minot State University alumni
Republican Party North Dakota state senators
1936 births
Living people
21st-century American politicians